John Rellstab (September 19, 1858 – September 22, 1930) was a United States district judge of the United States District Court for the District of New Jersey.

Education and career

Born in Trenton, New Jersey, Rellstab read law to enter the bar in 1882. He was in private practice in Trenton from 1882 to 1896, and was a borough attorney for Chambersburg, New Jersey from 1884 to 1888, and city counsel for Trenton from 1889 to 1892 and from 1894 to 1896. He was a Judge of the District Court of Trenton from 1896 to 1900, and of the Mercer County, New Jersey Court of Common Pleas from 1900 to 1909.

Federal judicial service

On May 6, 1909, Rellstab was nominated by President William Howard Taft to a seat on the United States District Court for the District of New Jersey vacated by Judge William M. Lanning. Rellstab was confirmed by the United States Senate on May 18, 1909, and received his commission the same day. He assumed senior status on October 10, 1928, and served in that capacity until his death on September 22, 1930, in Lake Placid, New York.

References

Sources
 

1858 births
1930 deaths
Judges of the United States District Court for the District of New Jersey
United States district court judges appointed by William Howard Taft
20th-century American judges
People from Trenton, New Jersey
United States federal judges admitted to the practice of law by reading law